Phenacaine, also known as holocaine, is a local anesthetic. It is approved for ophthalmic use.

Synthesis

The condensation of P-Phenetidine (1) with triethyl orthoacetate [78-39-7] (2) to afford the imino ether (a so-called Pinner salt) (3). Reaction of that intermediate with a second equivalent of the aniline results (4) in a net displacement of ethanol, probably by an addition-elimination scheme. There is thus obtained the amidine, phenacaine (5).

In the patented synthesis, phenacetin was used as precursor. Treatment with PCl3 gave the enol chloride, and reaction of this intermediate with p-phenetidine then completed the synthesis of phenacaine.

References 

Local anesthetics
Phenol ethers
Anilines
Amidines